The  International Journal of the Asian Philosophical Association  (IJAPA) is a peer reviewed bi-annual online interdisciplinary journal of Asian philosophy founded in 2008. The journal is published by the Asian Philosophical Association.

External links 
 IJAPA website

Philosophy journals
Asian philosophy
Publications established in 2008
Biannual journals